The Philadelphia Phillies' 2008 season was the 126th in the history of the franchise. The team finished with a regular season record of 92–70, first in the National League East. In the postseason, the Phillies won the World Series; this was the first major sports championship for Philadelphia since the 76ers swept the 1983 NBA Finals. During the season, they were managed by Charlie Manuel. To date, this is the most recent season the Phillies won the World Series.

The Phillies opened the season by posting their first winning April since 2003. They also scored 60 runs over 5 games in late May in a sweep over the Colorado Rockies and accrued a 14–4 record over 18 games entering the month of June. The Phillies' performance declined in late June, but they improved after the All-Star break, going 9–6 immediately following the midseason hiatus. Closer Brad Lidge earned eight saves in those games, and did not blow a save throughout the season and the postseason. Philadelphia traded sweeps with the Los Angeles Dodgers in August and went 13–3 in their last 16 games, taking advantage of a late swoon by the New York Mets for the second year in a row to capture the division crown. The team won its position in the playoffs after its second consecutive East Division title. The Phillies also posted the best road record in the National League, at 44–37.

Philadelphia defeated the Milwaukee Brewers in the National League Division Series (NLDS), 3–1, and the Dodgers in the National League Championship Series (NLCS), 4–1, to win the National League Pennant and advance to the World Series. In the World Series, the Phillies defeated the Tampa Bay Rays, 4–1, to win their first championship in 28 years, ending the Curse of Billy Penn. Phillies starting pitcher Cole Hamels was named the Most Valuable Player of the NLCS and the World Series.

Statistical leaders in batting for the 2008 team included center fielder Shane Victorino (batting average, .293), first baseman Ryan Howard (home runs, 48; runs batted in, 146), and second baseman Chase Utley (runs scored, 113). For their accomplishments, Howard won the Josh Gibson Award for the National League, and Utley won his third consecutive Silver Slugger Award. Pitching leaders included left-handed starting pitcher Hamels (innings pitched, 227), left-hander starter Jamie Moyer (wins, 16), and right-handed relief pitcher Lidge (saves, 41). Lidge won the DHL Delivery Man of the Year and the Major League Baseball Comeback Player of the Year awards for his performance during the season. Victorino and shortstop Jimmy Rollins also won Gold Glove awards for their play in the field.

Offseason

Players and coaches
On October 29, 2007, Charlie Manuel signed an extension to manage the Phillies for two more years. All of the coaches from the 2007 division championship season were also retained. However, Davey Lopes underwent treatment for cancer and had to be replaced on an interim basis in the early part of the season. The Phillies re-signed left-handed relief pitcher J. C. Romero to a new two-year contract after a dominating 2007, in which he struck out 42 batters in  innings pitched while posting a 1.92 earned run average. Outfielder Michael Bourn and right-handed pitcher Geoff Geary were traded to Houston for closer Brad Lidge and infielder Eric Bruntlett on November 7, 2007. Outfielder Chris Roberson was traded to Baltimore for cash in January 2008, while third baseman Pedro Feliz, outfielder Geoff Jenkins, and outfielder So Taguchi arrived as free agents; Feliz was signed on January 31, while Jenkins and Taguchi signed the month before. In the broadcast booth, Tom McCarthy also returned to the team after two years as a radio announcer for the New York Mets.

Uniforms
On November 29, 2007, the team announced that in honor of the franchise's 125th anniversary of playing in Philadelphia, the Phillies would wear an alternate home uniform based on their 1948 uniforms for all day home games during the season. The cap formerly used for interleague play, a red-crowned cap with a blue bill and a star within the "P" logo, was retired.

Controversy with the Mets

On February 16, 2008, Mets center fielder Carlos Beltrán made a statement regarding the upcoming season. He stated that "[without] Santana, we felt, as a team, that we had a chance to win in our division. With him now, I have no doubt that we're going to win in our division. I have no doubt in that. We've got what it takes. To Jimmy Rollins: We are the team to beat." Beltran's statement echoed Rollins' 2007 assertion that the Phillies were "the team to beat in the NL East—finally". Inasmuch as Beltran had imitated Rollins' 2007 preseason prediction, Rollins arrived in camp for Spring training and responded: "There isn't a team in the National League that's better than us. The pressure's back on them if you ask me. They were on paper the best team in the division last year and they were supposed to win, and they didn't. One, there are four other teams in our division who are going to make sure that doesn't happen, and two, has anyone ever heard of plagiarism?  That was pretty good, especially coming from him. He's a quiet guy, so it was probably shocking when he said it. Not shocking in a bad way, like 'Wow, I can't believe he said  that.' More like, 'Wow, he finally said something because he's a leader on that team and you definitely need to be a vocal leader.'"

Regular season

Monthly summaries

March/April

The Phillies opened the season against the Washington Nationals at home on March 31. They failed to win any of their first three series, losing two of three against the Nationals and New York Mets, with a four-game split against the Cincinnati Reds between those series. The Phillies won their next two series against the Chicago Cubs and the Houston Astros. After dropping a second series to the Mets, the Phillies finished the month with 15 wins and 12 losses. They did not achieve a three-game sweep against any team in the opening month, nor were they swept. By winning at least one game in each series, the Phillies were able to achieve their first winning April in several seasons, and only their fourth since their last World Series appearance in 1993.

With a batting average of .360 and his Major League Baseball-leading 11 home runs, Chase Utley paced the team's offense, followed closely by a resurgent Pat Burrell and his 25 runs batted in. Though team speed was hampered by the loss of Shane Victorino and Jimmy Rollins to the disabled list, the latter for the first time in his career, the Phillies still pushed forward to a 15–13 record, including their Opening Day loss to Washington. The pitching rotation was led by ace Cole Hamels, who led the team in wins (3), earned run average (ERA) (2.70), and innings pitched.

May
The Phillies did not achieve their first three-game series sweep until almost the end of May, taking two from the San Francisco Giants, the Arizona Diamondbacks (splitting the series 2–2), the Atlanta Braves, and the Nationals, and dropping two to the Giants, the Toronto Blue Jays, and the Astros. However, the Phillies' first sweep was achieved in dramatic fashion, as the offense broke out for 60 runs in five games, including a 20–5 win over the Colorado Rockies.

Though several fill-in players, including Brad Harman and T. J. Bohn, substituted during Victorino's and Rollins' absence, none was more valuable to the team during May than Jayson Werth. Expected to be primarily a platoon player coming into the season, Werth showed positive form. While Utley slowed down, Werth had a game with three home runs and stole four bases in the month. However, as Rollins and Victorino returned, Werth was lost to the disabled list. Ryan Howard broke out of his early-season slump, batting .245 in May, nearly an 80-point increase from his average in April, and hitting ten home runs. Hometown pitcher Jamie Moyer also became the sixth pitcher in Major League Baseball history to defeat all 30 teams in the league on May 26 in a 20–5 Phillies win over Colorado.

June
June was a tale of two halves for the Phillies, as they started June with a strong combination of offense and pitching. From May 26 to June 13, the team posted a 14–4 record, starting their run with a 15–6 win over the Astros and ended with a 20–2 win over the Cardinals, as their record reached a first-half high of 13 games over .500 at 41–28. However, the offense took a downturn as the Phillies pitchers began to sacrifice more runs in the latter part of the month. The Phillies went 3–11 over the remainder of June, as the pitchers allowed an average of 4.79 runs per game, compared to the offense's 3.36 runs scored per game.  This was punctuated by a season-high six-game losing streak. The poor records coincided with the Phillies' stretch of interleague play for 2008, as they were swept by the Angels, and lost their series with the Red Sox, A's, and Rangers, in addition to dropping two NL series against the Cardinals and Marlins. While Hamels and Kyle Kendrick each managed to post a 3–1 record in the rotation, the other starters (Moyer, Adam Eaton, and Brett Myers) were not so lucky. Myers' poor performance received arguably the most scrutiny, based on management's decision to move him back to the rotation from the bullpen after the 2007 season. Myers would eventually accept an option to Triple-A to work on his mechanical issues and confidence.

July

July began with the announcement that Chase Utley and Brad Lidge would represent the team at the 2008 Major League Baseball All-Star Game; Utley garnered the most votes of all National League players. Pat Burrell was also selected as a "Final Vote" candidate, but lost out on the opportunity for his first All-Star appearance to Milwaukee outfielder Corey Hart. The Phillies went 8–5 in July before the All-Star break, compiling a four-game win streak, a four-game losing streak, and winning four of their last five. The team posted a sweep of the Braves, a series loss to the Mets, and series wins over the Cardinals and the Diamondbacks.

In a move to bolster their starting rotation in preparation for the pennant race, the Phillies traded three minor league players, including second baseman Adrian Cardenas, pitcher Josh Outman, and outfielder Matthew Spencer to the Oakland Athletics for starting pitcher Joe Blanton on July 17. The move would prove necessary, as Blanton's start was the only game of their next series against the Mets that the Phillies would win; bullpen pitchers earned the victory (Chad Durbin) or suffered the loss (Ryan Madson and Romero) in each game of the series. The Phillies managed to go 7–5 after the All-Star break within their own division, dropping series to the Marlins and Mets, but besting the Braves and sweeping the Nationals. Brad Lidge posted a save in six straight Phillies wins, and the team ended the month on a five-game winning streak, with a final record of 15–10.

August
The Phillies opened August by taking two of three from the Cardinals, though they followed that by dropping a series to the Marlins. On August 7, the Phillies acquired left-handed reliever Scott Eyre from the Cubs. After taking two of three from the Pittsburgh Pirates, the Phillies went west for their first trip to Dodger Stadium, dropping three consecutive games to the Los Angeles Dodgers. The first game saw the team sacrifice a 7-run lead that they could not overcome, and the second two of the series were both blown by the bullpen. The Dodgers' sweep in Los Angeles was completed as the Phillies dropped the last game of the series, leaving them out of first place in the division. However, the Phillies struck back, taking two of three from both the Padres and the Nationals, and completing a revenge sweep of the Dodgers at Citizens Bank Park. The following evening, the Phillies saw starter Jamie Moyer give up seven runs over the first three innings of their game against the Mets. However, the offense made up that deficit by scoring the tying run in the ninth; catcher Chris Coste capped the comeback by going four-for-four coming off of the bench and driving in the winning run with a bases-loaded single to deep center in the bottom of the 13th inning.  They ended up splitting the short series with the Mets and the next four-game series against the Cubs to close out the "dog days" of summer.

September

With a nearly-full slate of division rivals in the final month, the Phillies opened by dropping series to the Nationals and Marlins, with a 2–1 series win over division leaders New York between the two losses. However, they pushed back into contention on the back of strong pitching, sweeping the Brewers over a four-game set while allowing only eight runs. Brett Myers' return to the rotation in late July bolstered the strength of the Phillies' starters toward the end of the season; he boasted a 7–2 record and a 1.80 ERA from his return until September 15. Taking their winning ways south to Atlanta, the Phillies completed a series sweep of the Braves; the Phillies also swept the Braves at Turner Field for the season and handed the Braves franchise its first nine-game home losing streak against a single team since 1909. With an 8–4 win over the Washington Nationals on September 26, the Phillies secured their first 90-win season since 1993. The next day, the Phillies clinched the NL East Division title for the second consecutive season, beating the Nationals by a score of 4–3. Jamie Moyer contributed a one-run, six-hit performance over six innings and Jayson Werth led off the fifth inning with a home run.  They won the division title as Brad Lidge earned his 41st consecutive save on a game-ending double play. Having gone an entire season without losing a save opportunity, Lidge was recognized as 2008's National League Comeback Player of the Year.

Season standings

National League East

Record vs. opponents

Game log

|- bgcolor="ffbbbb"
| 1 || March 31 || Nationals || 11–6 || Rivera (1–0) || Gordon (0–1) || || 44,553 || 0–1

|-  bgcolor="ffbbbb"
| 2 || April 2 || Nationals || 1–0 || Redding (1–0) || Hamels (0–1) || Rauch (1) || 44,986 || 0–2
|- bgcolor="bbffbb"
| 3 || April 3 || Nationals || 8–7  || Condrey (1–0) || Colome (0–1) || || 25,831 || 1–2
|- bgcolor="bbffbb"
| 4 || April 4 || @ Reds || 8–4 || Kendrick (1–0) || Fogg (0–1) || || 17,905 || 2–2
|- bgcolor="ffbbbb"
| 5 || April 5 || @ Reds || 4–3 || Cordero (1–0) || C. Durbin (0–1) ||  || 23,069 || 2–3
|- bgcolor="ffbbbb"
| 6 || April 6 || @ Reds || 8–2 || Vólquez (1–0) || Myers (0–1) || || 26,566 || 2–4
|- bgcolor="bbffbb"
| 7 || April 7 || @ Reds || 5–3 || Hamels (1–1) || Arroyo (0–1) || Lidge (1) || 14,647 || 3–4
|- bgcolor="bbffbb"
| 8 || April 8 || @ Mets || 5–2 || Moyer (1–0) || Pérez (0–1) || Gordon (1) || 56,350 || 4–4
|- bgcolor="ffbbbb"
| 9 || April 9 || @ Mets || 8–2 || Pelfrey (1–0) || Kendrick (1–1) || || 47,127 || 4–5
|- bgcolor="ffbbbb" 
| 10 || April 10 || @ Mets || 4–3  || Sosa (1–0) || Gordon (0–2) || || 49,049 || 4–6
|- bgcolor="bbffbb"
| 11 || April 11 || Cubs || 5–3 || Myers (1–1) || Zambrano (1–1) || Lidge (2) || 37,368 || 5–6
|- bgcolor="bbffbb"
| 12 || April 12 || Cubs || 7–1 || Hamels (2–1) || Lilly (0–2) || || 45,072 || 6–6
|- bgcolor="ffbbbb"
| 13 || April 13 || Cubs || 6–5  || Wood (1–0) ||  Seánez (0–1)|| Howry (1) || 40,095 || 6–7
|- bgcolor="bbffbb"
| 14 || April 15 || Astros || 4–3 || Seánez (1–1) || Valverde (2–1) || || 34,609 || 7–7
|- bgcolor="ffbbbb"
| 15 || April 16 || Astros || 2–1 || Oswalt (1–3) || Kendrick (1–2) || Brocail (1) || 31,644 || 7–8
|- bgcolor="bbffbb"
| 16 || April 17 || Astros || 10–2 || Myers (2–1) || Backe (1–2) || || 33,526 || 8–8
|- bgcolor="ffbbbb"
| 17 || April 18 || Mets || 6–4 || Santana (2–2) || Hamels (2–2) || Wagner (3) || 45,156 || 8–9
|- bgcolor="ffbbbb"
| 18 || April 19 || Mets || 4–2 || Pérez (2–0)|| Moyer (1–1) || Wagner (4) || 45,149 || 8–10
|- bgcolor="bbffbb"
| 19 || April 20 || Mets || 5–4 || Romero (1–0) || Feliciano (0–1) || Lidge (3) || 45,173 || 9–10
|- bgcolor="bbffbb"
| 20 || April 21 || @ Rockies || 9–5 || Seánez (2–1) || Buchholz (1–1) || || 24,886  || 10–10
|- bgcolor="bbffbb"
| 21 || April 22 || @ Rockies || 8–6 || Madson (1–0) || Corpas (0–1) || Lidge (4) || 26,665 || 11–10
|- bgcolor="ffbbbb"
| 22 || April 23 || @ Brewers || 5–4 || Stetter (1–0) || Hamels (2–3) || Turnbow (3) || 30,548 || 11–11
|- bgcolor="bbffbb"
| 23 || April 24 || @ Brewers || 3–1 || Gordon (1–2) || Riske 0–1 || Lidge (5) || 23,905 || 12–11
|- bgcolor="bbffbb"
| 24 || April 25 || @ Pirates || 6–5 || Gordon (2–2) || Duke (0–2) || Lidge (6) || 23,930 || 13–11
|- bgcolor="bbffbb"
| 25 || April 26 || @ Pirates || 8–4 || Kendrick (2–2) || Morris (0–4) || || 24,791 || 14–11
|- bgcolor="ffbbbb"
| 26 || April 27 || @ Pirates || 5–1 || Maholm (2–2) || Myers (2–2) || || 17,588 || 14–12
|- bgcolor="bbffbb"
| 27 || April 29 || Padres || 7–4 || Hamels (3–3) || Maddux (2–2) || || 34,207 || 15–12
|- bgcolor="ffbbbb"
| 28 || April 30 || Padres || 4–2 || Young (2–2) || Moyer (1–2) || Hoffman (5) || 36,648 || 15–13

|- bgcolor="bbffbb"
| 29 || May 1 || Padres || 3–2 || Gordon (3–2) || Thatcher (0–3) || Lidge (7) || 33,001 || 16–13
|- bgcolor="bbffbb"
| 30 || May 2 || Giants || 6–5  || Romero (2–0) || Wilson (0–1) || || 38,270 || 17–13
|- bgcolor="ffbbbb"
| 31 || May 3 || Giants || 3–2  || Taschner (1–0) || Seánez (2–2) || Wilson (10) || 43,804 || 17–14
|- bgcolor="bbffbb"
| 32 || May 4 || Giants || 6–5 || Lidge (1–0) || Yabu (2–2) || || 45,110 || 18–14
|- bgcolor="bbffbb"
| 33 || May 5 || @ D-backs || 11–4 || Moyer (2–2) || Scherzer (0–1) || || 21,266 || 19–14
|- bgcolor="ffbbbb"
| 34 || May 6 || @ D-backs || 6–4 || Johnson (2–1)|| Eaton (0–1) || Lyon (10) || 26,234 || 19–15
|- bgcolor="bbffbb"
| 35 || May 7 || @ D-backs || 5–4 || Romero (3–0) || Qualls (0–3) || Lidge (8) || 21,260 || 20–15
|- bgcolor="ffbbbb"
| 36 || May 8 || @ D-backs || 8–3 || Webb (8–0) || Myers (2–3) || || 21,942 || 20–16
|- bgcolor="bbffbb"
| 37 || May 9 || @ Giants || 7–4 || Hamels (4–3) || Walker (1–1) || Lidge (9) || 33,796 || 21–16
|- bgcolor="ffbbbb"
| 38 || May 10 || @ Giants || 8–2 || Lincecum (5–1) || Moyer (2–3) || || 34,064 || 21–17
|- bgcolor="ffbbbb"
| 39 || May 11 || @ Giants || 4–3 || Taschner (2–0)|| Romero (3–1) || Wilson (11) || 35,999 || 21–18
|- bgcolor="bbffbb"
| 40 || May 13 || Braves || 5–4 || Kendrick (3–2) || Reyes (0–1) || Lidge (10) || 44,101 || 22–18
|- bgcolor="ffbbbb"
| 41 || May 14 || Braves || 8–6 || Glavine (1–1) || Myers (2–4)  || Boyer (1) || 36,001 || 22–19
|- bgcolor="bbffbb"
| 42 || May 15 || Braves || 5–0 || Hamels (5–3) || James (2–3) || || 34,120 || 23–19
|- bgcolor="bbffbb"
| 43 || May 16 || Blue Jays || 10–3 || Moyer (3–3) || Purcey (0–1) || || 36,600 || 24–19
|- bgcolor="ffbbbb"
| 44 || May 17 || Blue Jays || 6–3 || Burnett (4–4) || Eaton (0–2) || Ryan (8) || 42,604 || 24–20
|- bgcolor="ffbbbb"
| 45 || May 18 || Blue Jays || 6–5 || Frasor (1–0) || Seánez (2–3) || Ryan (9) || 42,858 || 24–21
|- bgcolor="ffbbbb"
| 46 || May 19 || @ Nationals || 4–0 || Redding (6–3) || Myers (2–5) || || 25,394 || 24–22
|- bgcolor="bbffbb"
| 47 || May 20 || @ Nationals || 1–0 || Gordon (4–2) || Rauch (2–1) || Lidge (11) || 28,105 || 25–22
|- bgcolor="bbffbb"
| 48 || May 21 || @ Nationals || 12–2 || Moyer (4–3) || Chico (0–6) || Condrey (1) || 28,055 || 26–22
|- bgcolor="bbffbb"
| 49 || May 22 || @ Astros || 7–5 || C. Durbin (1–1) || Wright (3–2) || Lidge (12) || 29,263 || 27–22
|- bgcolor="ffbbbb"
| 50 || May 23 || @ Astros || 4–3 || Backe (4–3) || Eaton (0–3) || Valverde (15) || 41,152 || 27–23
|- bgcolor="ffbbbb"
| 51 || May 24 || @ Astros || 4–3 || Moehler (2–1) || Myers (2–6) || Brocail (2) || 42,660 || 27–24
|- bgcolor="bbffbb"
| 52 || May 25 || @ Astros || 15–6 || Seánez (3–3) || Nieve (0–1) || || 43,079 || 28–24
|- bgcolor="bbffbb"
| 53 || May 26 || Rockies || 20–5 || Moyer (5–3) || de la Rosa (1–3) || || 44,764 || 29–24
|- bgcolor="bbffbb"
| 54 || May 27 || Rockies || 7–4 || Kendrick (4–2) || Jiménez (1–5) || || 34,716 || 30–24
|- bgcolor="bbffbb"
| 55 || May 28 || Rockies || 6–1 || Eaton (1–3) || Reynolds (0–2) || || 39,845 || 31–24
|- bgcolor="bbffbb"
| 56 || May 30 || Marlins || 12–3 || Myers (3–6) || Hendrickson (7–3) || || 45,118 || 32–24
|- bgcolor="ffbbbb"
| 57 || May 31 || Marlins || 7–3 || Nolasco (5–3) || Hamels (5–4) || || 45,261 || 32–25

|- bgcolor="bbffbb"
| 58 || June 1 || Marlins || 7–5 || Moyer (6–3) || Waechter (0–1) || Lidge (13) || 45,312 || 33–25
|- bgcolor="bbffbb"
| 59 || June 2 || Reds || 5–4 || Kendrick (5–2) || Arroyo (4–5)|| Lidge (14) || 38,530 || 34–25
|- bgcolor="bbffbb"
| 60 || June 3 || Reds || 3–2 || Eaton (2–3) || Harang (2–8) || Lidge (15) || 45,096 || 35–25
|- bgcolor="ffbbbb"
| 61 || June 4 || Reds || 2–0 || Vólquez (8–2) || Myers (3–7) || F. Cordero (12) || 45,223 || 35–26
|- bgcolor="bbffbb"
| 62 || June 5 || Reds || 5–0 || Hamels (6–4) || Bailey (0–1) || || 45,492 || 36–26
|- bgcolor="bbffbb"
| 63 || June 6 || @ Braves || 4–3  || Gordon (5–2) || Acosta  (3–4) || Lidge (16) || 34,074 || 37–26
|- bgcolor="bbffbb"
| 64 || June 7 || @ Braves || 6–2 || Romero (4–1) || Reyes (2–4)|| || 43,854 || 38–26
|- bgcolor="bbffbb"
| 65 || June 8 || @ Braves || 6–3 || C. Durbin (2–1) || Boyer (1–4) || Lidge (17) || 33,370 || 39–26
|- bgcolor="ffbbbb"
| 66 || June 10 || @ Marlins || 5–4 || Nolasco (6–4) || Myers (3–8)|| Gregg (12) || 12,411 || 39–27
|- bgcolor="ffbbbb"
| 67 || June 11 || @ Marlins || 6–2 ||Gregg (5–2) || Gordon (5–3) || || 14,122 || 39–28
|- bgcolor="bbffbb"
| 68 || June 12 || @ Marlins || 3–0 || Moyer (7–3) || Olsen (4–3) || Lidge (18) || 15,202 || 40–28
|- bgcolor="bbffbb"
| 69 || June 13 || @ Cardinals || 20–2 || Kendrick (6–2) || Wellemeyer (7–2) || || 44,376 || 41–28
|- bgcolor="ffbbbb"
| 70 || June 14 || @ Cardinals || 3–2 || Lohse (8–2) || Eaton (2–4) || Franklin (9) || 45,089 || 41–29
|- bgcolor="ffbbbb"
| 71 || June 15 || @ Cardinals || 7–6 || Reyes (2–1) || Gordon (5–4) || || 45,391 || 41–30
|- bgcolor="bbffbb"
| 72 || June 16 || Red Sox || 8–2 ||  Hamels (7–4) || Colón (4–2) || || 45,026  || 42–30
|- bgcolor="ffbbbb"
| 73 || June 17 || Red Sox || 3–0 || Lester (6–3) || Moyer (7–4) || Papelbon (20) || 45,160 || 42–31
|- bgcolor="ffbbbb"
| 74 || June 18 || Red Sox || 7–4 || Masterson (4–1) || Kendrick (6–3) || Papelbon (21) || 45,187 || 42–32
|- bgcolor="ffbbbb"
| 75 || June 20 || Angels || 7–1 || E. Santana (9–3) || Eaton (2–5) || || 45,033 || 42–33
|- bgcolor="ffbbbb"
| 76 || June 21 || Angels || 6–2 || Saunders (11–3) || Myers (3–9) || Rodríguez (29) || 45,196 || 42–34
|- bgcolor="ffbbbb"
| 77 || June 22 || Angels || 3–2 || Weaver (7–7) || Hamels (7–5) || Rodríguez (30) || 44,571 || 42–35
|- bgcolor="ffbbbb"
| 78 || June 24 || @ Athletics || 5–2 || Blanton (4–10) || Moyer (7–5) || Street (14) || 13,348 || 42–36
|- bgcolor="bbffbb" 
| 79 || June 25 || @ Athletics || 4–0 || Kendrick (7–3) || Smith (4–6) || || 22,231 || 43–36
|- bgcolor="ffbbbb"
| 80 || June 26 || @ Athletics || 5–0 || Harden (5–0) || Eaton (2–6) || || 17,228 || 43–37
|- bgcolor="ffbbbb"
| 81 || June 27 || @ Rangers || 8–7 || Rupe (3–1) || Condrey (1–1) || Wilson (17) || 28,623 || 43–38
|- bgcolor="bbffbb"
| 82 || June 28 || @ Rangers || 8–6 || Hamels (8–5) || Padilla (10–4) || Lidge (19) || 35,039 || 44–38
|- bgcolor="ffbbbb"
| 83 || June 29 || @ Rangers || 5–1 || Hurley (1–1) || Moyer (7–6) || || 26,283 || 44–39

|- bgcolor="bbffbb" 
| 84 || July 1 || @ Braves || 8–3 || Kendrick (8–3) || Morton (1–2) || || 29,206 || 45–39
|- bgcolor="bbffbb" 
| 85 || July 2 || @ Braves || 7–3 || Eaton (3–6) || Campillo (3–3) || || 30,138 || 46–39
|- bgcolor="bbffbb" 
| 86 || July 3 || @ Braves || 4–1 || Hamels (9–5) || Jurrjens (8–4) || Gordon (2) || 28,805 || 47–39
|-bgcolor="bbffbb" 
| 87 || July 4 || Mets || 3–2 || Lidge (2–0) || Sánchez (3–1) || || 44,922 || 48–39
|- bgcolor="ffbbbb"
| 88 || July 5 || Mets || 9–4 || Feliciano (1–2) || Romero (4–2) || || 45,190 || 48–40
|- bgcolor="ffbbbb"
| 89 || July 6 || Mets || 4–2  || Smith (1–1) || C. Durbin (2–2) || || 45,203 || 48–41
|- bgcolor="ffbbbb"
| 90 || July 7 || Mets || 10–9 || Martínez (3–2) || Eaton (3–7) || Wagner (20) || 44,655 || 48–42
|- bgcolor="ffbbbb"
| 91 || July 8 || Cardinals || 2–0 || Piñeiro (3–4) || Hamels (9–6) || Franklin (12) || 41,519 || 48–43
|- bgcolor="bbffbb"
| 92 || July 9 || Cardinals || 4–2 || Condrey (2–1) || McClellan (1–4) || Lidge (20) || 44,951 || 49–43
|- bgcolor="bbffbb"
| 93 || July 10 || Cardinals || 4–1 || Moyer (8–6) || Looper (9–7) || Romero (1) || 44,241 || 50–43
|- bgcolor="bbffbb"
| 94 || July 11 || D-backs || 6–5  || Seánez (4–3) || Robertson (0–1) || || 45,028 || 51–43
|- bgcolor="ffbbbb"
| 95 || July 12 || D-backs || 10–4 || Johnson (6–7) || Eaton (3–8) || || 45,006 || 51–44
|- bgcolor="bbffbb"
| 96 || July 13 || D-backs ||6–3 ||Madson (2–0) ||Qualls (2–7) || ||45,277 ||52–44
|- bgcolor="bbbbff"
|align="center" colspan=9|All-Star Break: AL def. NL at Yankee Stadium, 4–3 
|- bgcolor="bbffbb"
| 97 || July 18 || @ Marlins || 4–2 || Moyer (9–6) ||Nolasco (10–5) || Lidge (21) || 23,124 || 53–44
|- bgcolor="ffbbbb"
| 98 || July 19 || @ Marlins || 9–5 || Olsen (6–4) || Kendrick (8–4) || || 26,520 || 53–45
|- bgcolor="ffbbbb"
| 99 || July 20 || @ Marlins || 3–2  || Waechter (2–2) || Condrey (2–2) || || 17,724 || 53–46
|- bgcolor="bbffbb"
| 100 || July 22 || @ Mets || 8–6 || C. Durbin (3–2) || Smith (1–2) || Lidge (22) || 55,081 || 54–46
|- bgcolor="ffbbbb"
| 101 || July 23 || @ Mets || 6–3 || Maine (9–7) || Madson (2–1) || Wagner (25) || 53,444 || 54–47
|- bgcolor="ffbbbb" 
| 102 || July 24 || @ Mets || 3–1 || Heilman (1–3) || Romero (4–3) || Wagner (26) || 50,962 || 54–48
|- bgcolor="ffbbbb" 
| 103 || July 25 || Braves || 8–2 || Jurrjens (10–5) || Kendrick (8–5) || || 45,114 || 54–49
|- bgcolor="bbffbb"
| 104 || July 26 || Braves || 10–9 || Eaton (4–8) || Boyer (2–6) || Lidge (23) || 45,107 || 55–49
|- bgcolor="bbffbb"
| 105 || July 27 || Braves || 12–10 || Condrey (3–2) || Tavárez (0–3) || Lidge (24) || 45,096 || 56–49
|- bgcolor="bbffbb"
| 106 || July 29 || @ Nationals || 2–1 || Myers (4–9) || Balester (1–3) || Lidge (25) || 34,039 || 57–49
|- bgcolor="bbffbb"
| 107 || July 30 || @ Nationals || 8–5 || Moyer (10–6) || Redding (7–6) || Lidge (26)  || 31,798 || 58–49
|- bgcolor="bbffbb"
| 108 || July 31 || @ Nationals || 8–4 || Kendrick (9–5) || Lannan (6–11) || || 31,658 || 59–49

|- bgcolor="ffbbbb"
| 109 || August 1 || @ Cardinals || 6–3 || Lohse (13–3) || Hamels (9–7) || Isringhausen (12) || 44,234 || 59–50
|- bgcolor="bbffbb"
| 110 || August 2 || @ Cardinals ||2–1 ||Blanton (6–12) ||Looper (10–9) ||Lidge (27)  ||45,450 ||60–50
|- bgcolor="bbffbb"
| 111 || August 3 || @ Cardinals ||5–4 ||Durbin (4–2) ||García (0–1) ||Lidge (28) || 44,655 ||61–50
|- bgcolor="ffbbbb"
| 112 || August 5 || Marlins || 8–2 || Johnson (2–0) || Moyer (10–7) || || 44,896 || 61–51
|- bgcolor="bbffbb"
| 113 || August 6 || Marlins || 5–0 || Kendrick (10–5) || Sánchez (1–1) || || 45,078 || 62–51
|- bgcolor="ffbbbb"
| 114 || August 7 || Marlins || 3–0 || Volstad (3–2) || Hamels (9–8) || Gregg (25) || 45,521 || 62–52
|- bgcolor="ffbbbb"
| 115 || August 8 || Pirates || 2–0  || Beam (1–1) || Walrond (0–1) || Hansen (3) || 43,891 || 62–53
|- bgcolor="bbffbb"
| 116 || August 9 || Pirates || 4–2 || Myers (5–9) || Snell (4–9) || C. Durbin (1) || 45,060 || 63–53
|-  bgcolor="bbffbb"
| 117 || August 10 || Pirates || 6–3 || Eyre (3–0) || Yates (4–3) || Madson (1) || 45,262 || 64–53
|- bgcolor="ffbbbb"
| 118 || August 11 || @ Dodgers || 8–6 || Lowe (9–10) || Kendrick (10–6) || Broxton (8) || 45,547 || 64–54
|- bgcolor="ffbbbb"
| 119 || August 12 || @ Dodgers || 4–3 || Kuo (4–2) || Romero (4–4) || || 47,586 || 64–55
|- bgcolor="ffbbbb"
| 120 || August 13 || @ Dodgers || 7–6 || Broxton (3–3) || Condrey (3–3) || || 45,786 || 64–56
|- bgcolor="ffbbbb"
| 121 || August 14 || @ Dodgers || 3–1 || Kuroda (7–8) || Myers (5–10) || Kuo (1) || 51,060 || 64–57
|- bgcolor="bbffbb"
| 122 || August 15 || @ Padres || 1–0 || Moyer (11–7) || Maddux (6–9) || Lidge (29) || 37,558 || 65–57
|- bgcolor="ffbbbb"
| 123 || August 16 || @ Padres || 8–3 || Reineke (1–0) || Kendrick (10–7) || || 33,956 || 65–58
|- bgcolor="bbffbb"
| 124 || August 17 || @ Padres || 2–1 || Hamels (10–8) || Baek (4–7) || Lidge (30) || 34,756 || 66–58
|- bgcolor="bbffbb"
| 125 || August 19 || Nationals || 5–4 || Madson (3–1) || Shell (0–1) || Lidge (31) || 44,143 || 67–58
|- bgcolor="bbffbb"
| 126 || August 20 || Nationals || 4–0 || Myers (6–10) || Balester (2–6) || || 45,166 || 68–58
|- bgcolor="ffbbbb"
| 127 || August 21 || Nationals || 3–4 || Rivera (4–5) || Madson (3–2) || || 41,568 || 68–59
|- bgcolor="bbffbb"
| 128 || August 22 || Dodgers || 8–1 || Kendrick (11–7) || Maddux (6–10) || || 42,620 || 69–59
|-  bgcolor="bbffbb" 
| 129 || August 23 || Dodgers || 9–2 || Hamels (11–8) || Kershaw (2–4) || || 45,019 || 70–59
|-  bgcolor="bbffbb"
| 130 || August 24 || Dodgers || 5–2  || Durbin (5–2) || Beimel (4–1) || ||  43,039 || 71–59
|-  bgcolor="bbffbb"
| 131 || August 25 || Dodgers || 5–0 || Myers (7–10) || Billingsley (12–10) || || 40,873 || 72–59
|- bgcolor="bbffbb"
| 132 || August 26 || Mets || 8–7  || Seánez (5–3) || Schoeneweis (2–3) || || 45,204 || 73–59
|- bgcolor="ffbbbb"
| 133 || August 27 || Mets || 6–3 || Stokes (1–0) || Seánez (5–4) || Ayala (2) || 45,138 || 73–60
|- bgcolor="ffbbbb"
| 134 || August 28 || @ Cubs || 6–4 || Howry (6–4) || C. Durbin (5–3) || Wood (28) || 40,362 || 73–61
|- bgcolor="ffbbbb"
| 135 || August 29 || @ Cubs || 3–2 || Samardzija (1–0) || Condrey (3–4) || Mármol (7) || 40,844 || 73–62
|- bgcolor="bbffbb"
| 136 || August 30 || @ Cubs || 5–2 || Myers (8–10) || Lilly (13–8) || Lidge (32) || 41,511 || 74–62
|-  bgcolor="bbffbb"
| 137 || August 31 || @ Cubs || 5–3 || Moyer (12–7) || S. Marshall || Lidge (33) || 41,544 || 75–62

|- bgcolor="ffbbbb"
| 138 || September 1 || @ Nationals || 7–4 || Redding (10–8) || Kendrick (11–8) || || 28,393 || 75–63
|- bgcolor="bbffbb"
| 139 || September 2 || @ Nationals || 4–0 || Hamels (12–8) || Lannan (8–13) || || 23,150 || 76–63
|- bgcolor="ffbbbb"
| 140 || September 3 || @ Nationals || 9–7 || Rivera (5–5) || C. Durbin (5–4) || || 23,122 || 76–64
|- bgcolor="bbffbb"
| 141 || September 5 || @ Mets || 3–0 || Myers (9–10) || Pelfrey (13–9) || Lidge (34) || 48,302 || 77–64
|- bgcolor="bbbbbb"
| — || September 6 ||colspan=7|Postponed due to weather 
|- bgcolor="bbffbb"
| 142 || September 7 || @ Mets  || 6–2 || Moyer (13–7) || Martínez (5–4) || || 55,797 || 78–64
|- bgcolor="ffbbbb"
| 143 || September 7 || @ Mets  || 6–3 || Santana (13–7) || Hamels (12–9) || || 54,980 || 78–65
|- bgcolor="bbffbb"
| 144 || September 8 || Marlins || 8–6 || Blanton (7–12) || Sánchez (2–4) || Lidge (35) || 38,921 || 79–65
|- bgcolor="ffbbbb"
| 145 || September 9 || Marlins || 10–8 || Gregg (7–8) || Kendrick (11–9) || Lindstrom (2) || 40,554 || 79–66
|- bgcolor="ffbbbb"
| 146 || September 10 || Marlins || 7–3 || Nolasco (14–7) || Myers (9–11) || || 38,665 || 79–67
|- bgcolor="bbffbb"
| 147 || September 11 || Brewers || 6–3 || Moyer (14–7) || Sheets (13–8) || Lidge (36) || 39,994 || 80–67
|- bgcolor="bbbbbb"
| — || September 12 ||colspan=7|Postponed due to weather 
|- bgcolor="bbffbb"
| 148 || September 13 || Brewers || 7–3 || Hamels (13–9) || Parra (10–8) || || 45,105 || 81–67
|- bgcolor="bbffbb"
| 149 || September 14 || Brewers  || 7–3 || Eyre (4–0) || Mota (5–6) || || 43,950 || 82–67
|- bgcolor="bbffbb"
| 150 || September 14 || Brewers  || 6–1 || Myers (10–11) || Suppan (10–9) || || 39,776 || 83–67
|- bgcolor="bbffbb"
| 151 || September 16 || @ Braves || 8–7 || Madson (4–2) || González (0–3) || Lidge (37) || 30,319 || 84–67
|- bgcolor="bbffbb"
| 152 || September 17 || @ Braves || 6–1 || Happ (1–0) || Jurrjens (13–10) || || 32,821 || 85–67
|- bgcolor="bbffbb"
| 153 || September 18 || @ Braves || 4–3 || Hamels (14–9) || Hampton (2–3) || Lidge (38) || 39,070 || 86–67
|- bgcolor="ffbbbb"
| 154 || September 19 || @ Marlins || 14–8 || Johnson (6–1) || Myers (10–12) || || 20,202 || 86–68
|- bgcolor="bbffbb"
| 155 || September 20 || @ Marlins || 3–2 || Blanton (8–12) || Sánchez (2–5) || Lidge (39) || 28,757 || 87–68
|- bgcolor="bbffbb"
| 156 || September 21 || @ Marlins || 5–2 || Moyer (15–7) || Volstad (5–4) || Lidge (40) || 28,173 || 88–68
|- bgcolor="bbffbb"
| 157 || September 22 || Braves || 6–2 || Eyre (5–0) || Bennett (3–7) || || 36,796 || 89–68
|- bgcolor="ffbbbb"
| 158 || September 23 || Braves || 3–2 || Hampton (3–3) || Hamels (14–10) || González (14) || 39,322 || 89–69
|- bgcolor="ffbbbb"
| 159 || September 24 || Braves || 10–4 || Carlyle (2–0) || Myers (10–13) || || 41,430 || 89–70
|- bgcolor="bbffbb"
| 160 || September 26 || Nationals || 8–4 || Blanton (9–12) || Balester (3–7) || || 44,145 || 90–70
|- bgcolor="bbffbb"
| 161 || September 27 || Nationals || 4–3 || Moyer (16–7) || Lannan (9–15) || Lidge (41) || 45,177 || 91–70
|- bgcolor="bbffbb"
| 162 || September 28 || Nationals || 8–3 || Walrond (1–1) || Pérez (7–12) || || 44,945 || 92–70

|-
|  Source: baseball-reference.com

Postseason Game Log
 

|- style="background:#bfb;"
| 1 || October 1 || Brewers || 3–1 || || || || 45,929 || 1–0
|- style="background:#bfb;"
| 2 || October 2 || Brewers || 5–2 || || || || 46,208 || 2–0
|- style="background:#fbb;"
| 3 || October 4 || @ Brewers || 1–4 || || || || 43,992 || 2–1
|- style="background:#bfb;"
| 4 || October 5 || @ Brewers || 6–2 || || || || 43,934 || 3–1

|- style="background:#bfb;"
| 1 || October 9 || Dodgers || 3–2 || || || || 45,839 || 1–0
|- style="background:#bfb;"
| 2 || October 10 || Dodgers || 8–5 || || || || 45,883 || 2–0
|- style="background:#fbb;"
| 3 || October 12 || @ Dodgers || 2–7 || || || || 56,800 || 2–1
|- style="background:#bfb;"
| 4 || October 13 || @ Dodgers || 7–5 || || || || 56,800 || 3–1
|- style="background:#bfb;"
| 5 || October 15 || @ Dodgers || 5–1 || || || || 56,800 || 4–1

|- style="background:#bfb;"
| 1 || October 22 || @ Rays || 3–2 || || || || 40,783 || 1–0
|- style="background:#fbb;"
| 2 || October 23 || @ Rays || 2–4 || || || || 40,843 || 1–1
|- style="background:#bfb;"
| 3 || October 25 || Rays || 5–4 || || || || 45,900 || 2–1
|- style="background:#bfb;"
| 4 || October 26 || Rays || 10–2 || || || || 45,903 || 3–1
|- style="background:#bfb;"
| 5 || October 27, 29 || Rays || 4–3 || || || || 45,940 || 4–1

Roster
All players who made an appearance for the Phillies during 2008 are included.

Postseason

National League Division Series

Following their four-game sweep of Milwaukee in the beginning of September, the Phillies recorded their first playoff win since their 1993 World Series appearance on October 1, defeating the Brewers in Game 1. Cole Hamels was the victor, earning his first career playoff win. Hamels allowed no runs and two hits over his eight innings of work. Chase Utley batted in two runs, while Ryan Howard walked three times in the game. In Game 2, Shane Victorino's grand slam was all the run support starter Brett Myers needed, as he pitched seven innings and allowed only two runs. The Phillies' second consecutive victory was also supported by a pair of doubles from Victorino and from Jayson Werth. In a reversal of fortune, the Brewers scored two runs in the first inning of Game 3, and it proved to be enough to win the game. Brewers starter Dave Bush and closer Salomón Torres were able to hold off the Phillies despite a rally in the top of the ninth inning, keeping the Brewers alive for Game 4. However, the Phillies defeated the Brewers in Game 4 at Miller Park to win the series, 3–1. Jimmy Rollins, Jayson Werth and Pat Burrell all hit solo home runs, and Burrell contributed a three-run homer as well. Joe Blanton struck out seven Brewers, holding the team to one run on five hits through six innings.

Box scores
Game 1

Game 2

Game 3

Game 4

National League Championship Series

Facing off against the Los Angeles Dodgers in the NLCS for the fourth time in history, Derek Lowe stifled the Phillies' offense for the first five innings of Game 1; however, the Phillies came from behind to score three runs in the sixth on home runs by Utley and Burrell. Hamels followed his stellar NLDS performance with a seven-inning, two-run outing, and Brad Lidge earned his 44th consecutive save in 2008. Manny Ramírez' home run could not overcome the Phillies' potent offense in Game 2, who scored four runs in both the second and third innings to win the game, 8–5. Starting pitcher Brett Myers was 3 for 3 at the plate, driving in three runs to help his own cause. He was supported by two-hit performances from Victorino and Greg Dobbs, who started at third base. Tensions escalated the following night in the third inning. After a beanball and a throw-behind by the Phillies in the previous game and no retaliation from the Dodgers, Los Angeles starter Hiroki Kuroda threw a fastball up and in to Shane Victorino, narrowly missing his head. Victorino gestured angrily, warning Kuroda to throw at other parts of his body, but not his head. This soon escalated to clearing the benches, and the Dodgers rode their momentum to the end of the game, defeating the Phillies 7–2 after posting five runs in the first inning.  The Phillies staged another comeback in the following game. Down 5–3 in the eighth inning, two home runs by Shane Victorino and pinch-hitter Matt Stairs plated four runs and put the Dodgers in a hole out of which they could not climb; the Phillies won the game 7–5. In the first decisions of the series for either bullpen, right-handed reliever Ryan Madson got the win for Philadelphia, while Cory Wade suffered the loss for Los Angeles. Dodgers fans were hoping for a comeback in game five; however, Jimmy Rollins started the contest with a leadoff homer off of Chad Billingsley, who was forced out of the game in the third inning because of a pair of Phillies runs. Philadelphia added two runs on a trio of Rafael Furcal errors in the fifth. Ramírez did bring the Dodger Stadium crowd to life with a solo homer in the bottom of the sixth, but the Dodgers never threatened after that. The Phillies won the series in five games; winning pitcher Cole Hamels was named the series Most Valuable Player (MVP). Thus, the Phillies advanced to the World Series for the first time since 1993.

Box scores
Game 1

Game 2

Game 3

Game 4

Game 5

2008 World Series

The Phillies played in their first Fall Classic in fifteen years, which began on October 22 against the Tampa Bay Rays. The first two games were played at Tropicana Field in St. Petersburg, followed by three games at Citizens Bank Park. The Rays had home field advantage for the series, due to an American League victory in the 2008 All-Star Game. The Phillies defeated Tampa Bay, four games to one. Starting pitcher Cole Hamels (4–0, 1.80 ERA, 30 K in the postseason) was named the series MVP.

Game 1

Philadelphia scored the first runs of the series when Chase Utley hit a home run with Jayson Werth on base in the top of the first inning. Tampa Bay loaded the bases in the bottom of the third inning; however, Upton grounded into an inning-ending double play and the score remained 2–0. The Phillies extended their lead when Carlos Ruiz batted in Victorino in the fourth inning. A solo home run from Carl Crawford pulled the Rays back within two runs. Tampa Bay added their second run the following inning on an RBI double by Akinori Iwamura. Philadelphia starter Cole Hamels pitched seven innings and allowed only two runs, while Brad Lidge recorded his 47th consecutive save in 2008.

Game 2

Tampa starter James Shields shut down the Phillies lineup, scattering seven hits and allowing no runs in  innings of work. Outfielder B. J. Upton (2 for 4, one run scored, one RBI) and catcher Dioner Navarro (2 for 3, one run scored) led the offensive charge for the Rays as Brett Myers gave up four runs (three earned) while notching two strikeouts and three walks. Rather than power-hitting Matt Stairs, Charlie Manuel opted to go with Greg Dobbs as the DH; Dobbs was 1 for 3 for the Phillies, while Victorino and Howard supplied two hits each. Cliff Floyd extended the Rays' lead to four runs after leading off the bottom of the fourth inning with a single, advancing to third base, and scoring on a Jason Bartlett sacrifice bunt. The Phillies' loss tied the series at 1–1.

Game 3

After a 91-minute rain delay, the offenses fought back and forth, scoring run after run in an up-and-down affair in Philadelphia. Ryan Howard ended his home run drought, hitting his first round-tripper since the end of September. Chase Utley and Carlos Ruiz also hit home runs for the Phillies, while Carl Crawford and Dioner Navarro contributed a double each for the Rays. Philadelphia starter Jamie Moyer turned in his first strong performance of the postseason, allowing three runs over  innings. His counterpart Matt Garza allowed four runs over six innings, but neither would factor in the decision. After the Rays tied the game in the top of the eighth, the Phillies loaded the bases on two intentional walks with Eric Bruntlett on third base. Even with a five-man infield, Ruiz was still able to engineer some late-game heroics, sneaking a dribbling ground ball down the third base line to score Bruntlett. Philadelphia took a 2–1 series lead.

Game 4

The Phillies' offensive woes seemed in the distant past as the lineup broke out in a big way during Game 4. Led by Ryan Howard's 3-for-4, 2 home run performance, and home runs by Jayson Werth and starting pitcher Joe Blanton, the Phillies pushed 10 runs across the plate. Blanton became the first World Series pitcher to hit a home run in 34 years, in addition to a strong performance on the mound, pitching six innings and allowing two earned runs on four hits. Roster addition Eric Hinske hit a home run for the Rays, as did left fielder Carl Crawford, his second of the series.

Game 5

Philadelphia scored in the first inning for the third consecutive game, taking a 2–0 lead when Shane Victorino batted in Chase Utley and Jayson Werth. Tampa Bay cut the lead in half in the fourth inning; Carlos Peña doubled and was batted in on Evan Longoria's single, both players' first hits of the Series. The Rays then tied the game in the sixth inning when B. J. Upton scored from second base on a Peña single. The game was suspended after the top of the sixth inning due to rain, making it the first game in World Series history to not be played through to completion or declared a tie.

After the game was suspended, home plate umpire Tim Tschida told reporters that he and his crew ordered the players off the field because the wind and rain threatened to make the game "comical". Chase Utley agreed, saying that by the middle of the sixth inning, "the infield was basically underwater." Rain continued to fall in Philadelphia on Tuesday, further postponing the game to Wednesday.

Under normal conditions, games are considered to be official games after five innings, or four and a half if the home team is leading at that point.  However, both Rays and Phillies management knew before the first pitch that Commissioner Bud Selig, who is responsible for the scheduling of post-season games, would not allow a team to clinch the Series by winning a rain-shortened game. Thus, the game resumed on October 29 in the middle of the sixth inning at Citizens Bank Park, with the Phillies batting in the bottom of the sixth inning. Pinch hitter Geoff Jenkins led off with a double and was bunted to third by Rollins. Batting third, Jayson Werth batted in Jenkins to give the Phillies the lead, 3–2. Rocco Baldelli re-tied the game at three runs with a solo home run in the top of the seventh inning, but Jason Bartlett was thrown out at home to end the inning on a fake throw-over by Utley, which went down as one of the greatest plays in World Series history. In the bottom of the seventh, Pat Burrell led off with a double; Eric Bruntlett entered as a pinch runner and scored on a hit by Pedro Feliz to put the Phillies up by a run again. Brad Lidge gave up a single and a stolen base but struck out Eric Hinske for the final out, sealing the Phillies' first World Series championship since the 1980 World Series, and the city's first major sports championship in 25 years.

Breaking the curse

The alleged curse of Billy Penn was sometimes used to explain the failure of professional sports teams based in Philadelphia to win championships. For many decades, a gentlemen's agreement stated that the Philadelphia Art Commission would approve no building in the city that would rise above this statue. The supposed curse had gained such prominence in Philadelphia that a documentary film entitled The Curse of William Penn was produced about it.

The curse ended on October 29, 2008, when the Phillies won the World Series, a year and four months after a statuette of the William Penn figure atop City Hall was affixed to the final beam put in place during the June 2007 topping-off of the Comcast Center, then the tallest building in the city.

Awards
The 2008 team won the Commissioner's Trophy for its World Series title and the Warren C. Giles Trophy as National League champions. It was also named "Team of the Year" by the Philadelphia Sports Writers Association and received the Pride of Philadelphia Award from the Philadelphia Sports Hall of Fame. In 2009, the Philadelphia Sports Congress presented the team with the John Wanamaker Athletic Award.  In May 2009, the team was recognized at the White House.

Starter Cole Hamels received the NLCS and World Series MVP awards. He also received the Babe Ruth Award from the New York chapter of the Baseball Writers' Association of America (BBWAA).

Closer Brad Lidge was named the Major League Baseball Comeback Player of the Year and the DHL Delivery Man of the Year for his perfect 48-for-48 performance throughout the 2008 regular season and postseason. He also received the Rolaids NL Relief Man Award, the Sporting News NL Reliever of the Year Award, the Philadelphia Sports Writers Association (PSWA) Outstanding Pro Athlete award, and the  Daily News Sportsperson of the Year award.

Shortstop Jimmy Rollins and center fielder Shane Victorino were honored by Rawlings with Gold Gloves, honoring their defense in 2008. Rollins also received the Fielding Bible Award for shortstop. Rollins posted a fielding percentage of .988, compiling 193 putouts and 393 assists while making only seven errors; Victorino's fielding percentage was even higher, at .994, notching 7 assists from the outfield along with 328 putouts.

Clean-up hitter and first baseman Ryan Howard was named the recipient of the Babe Ruth Home Run Award (in MLB) and the Negro Baseball League Museum's Josh Gibson Legacy Award, as the NL leader in home runs. Howard hit 48 home runs in 2008, more than any other player in the National League. Howard also batted in 146 runs, and finished the regular season with 11 homers and 32 RBIs during September. Second baseman Chase Utley also won his third consecutive Silver Slugger Award, given annually to the best hitter in each league at his position.

Four of the This Year in Baseball Awards also went to the Phillies. Lidge was recognized as the Closer of the Year, while Utley won the Postseason Moment of the Year award for his fake throw to first base which allowed him to throw out Rays' shortstop Jason Bartlett at home plate during the World Series. Manager Charlie Manuel and general manager Pat Gillick were also named Manager of the Year (distinct from Major League Baseball's Manager of the Year award) and Executive of the Year, respectively, for their leadership of the 2008 team and for winning the World Series.

The Philadelphia chapter of the Baseball Writers' Association of America (BBWAA) presented its annual franchise awards to Brad Lidge ("Mike Schmidt Most Valuable Player Award"), Cole Hamels ("Steve Carlton Most Valuable Pitcher Award"), Jamie Moyer ("Dallas Green Special Achievement Award"), and Greg Dobbs ("Tug McGraw Good Guy Award").

Shane Victorino also received the Lou Gehrig Memorial Award for displaying character and integrity both on and off the field.

Pat Gillick also received the ceremonial title of King of Baseball from Minor League Baseball, in recognition of longtime dedication and service to professional baseball.

Regular season player statistics
All statistics are current through the 2008 regular season.

Key

Batting
Note: G = Games played; AB = At bats; R = Runs scored; H = Hits; 2B = Doubles; 3B = Triples; HR = Home runs; RBI = Runs batted in; AVG = Batting average; SB = Stolen bases

Pitching
Note: W = Wins; L = Losses; ERA = Earned run average; G = Games pitched; GS = Games started; SV = Saves; IP = Innings pitched; R = Runs allowed; ER = Earned runs allowed; BB = Walks allowed; K = Strikeouts

Footnotes

 Jamie Moyer became the sixth pitcher in history to defeat every team in Major League Baseball with a 20–5 win over the Rockies. Also, the Phillies won back-to-back games by more than 10 runs for the third time in their history.
 Chase Utley tied a franchise record by hitting a home run in his fifth straight game.
 Utley, Ryan Howard, and Pat Burrell hit back-to-back-to-back home runs in the first inning.  The Phillies' 20 runs were the most ever scored in a game at Busch Stadium III.  The Phillies sent 15 batters to the plate in a nine-run fourth inning, and every Phillies starter, as well as pinch-hitter Eric Bruntlett, reached base at least once in the game, with only pinch-hitter Greg Dobbs being denied.
 With a pinch-hit three-run home run in the fifth inning, Greg Dobbs tied a Phillies' franchise record with his twentieth pinch-hit of the season, tying Doc Miller. The home run turned out to be the game-winning RBI, as the Phillies overcame a nine-run Atlanta fourth inning with a seven-run fifth of their own.

Farm system 

 League champion: GCL Phillies

References
General reference

Inline citations

Further reading

External links
The Official Website of the Philadelphia Phillies

World Series champion seasons
National League champion seasons
National League East champion seasons
Philadelphia Phillies
Philadelphia Phillies seasons
Philadelphia Phillies